Imad Mizouri (born 20 October 1966) is a Tunisian footballer. He competed in the men's tournament at the 1988 Summer Olympics.

References

1966 births
Living people
Tunisian footballers
Tunisia international footballers
Olympic footballers of Tunisia
Footballers at the 1988 Summer Olympics
Place of birth missing (living people)
Association football defenders
Étoile Sportive du Sahel players